The 2008 Asian Junior Athletics Championships was the 13th edition of the international athletics competition for Asian under-20 athletes, organised by the Asian Athletics Association. It took place from 12–15 July at the Madya Stadium in Jakarta. It was the third occasion that the Indonesian capital had hosted the event, following the inaugural edition in 1986 and the fifth hosting in 1994. A total of 44 events were contested, which were divided equally between male and female athletes.

Medal summary

Men

Women

2008 Medal Table

References

Results
Asian Junior Championships 2008. World Junior Athletics History. Retrieved on 2013-10-16.

External links
Asian Athletics official website

Asian Junior Championships
Asian Junior Athletics Championships
International athletics competitions hosted by Indonesia
Sport in Jakarta
Asian Junior Athletics Championships
2008 in Asian sport
2008 in youth sport